Utica Queen is the stage name of Ethan David Mundt (born June 2, 1995), a drag performer most known for competing on season 13 of RuPaul's Drag Race.

Early life and education
Mundt was born to Robert Duane and Susan Melinda Mundt in Olmsted County, Minnesota and raised in Utica, Minnesota. He attended St. Charles High School.

Career
Utica Queen competed on season 13 of RuPaul's Drag Race. In 2021, some of her clothes were displayed at the Rochester Art Center.

Personal life
Mundt uses he/him/his pronouns out of drag and she/her pronouns in drag. He resides in Minneapolis, as of 2021. Mundt is a member of the Seventh-day Adventist Church.

References

External links

 

1995 births
Living people
American drag queens
American Seventh-day Adventists
LGBT people from Minnesota
People from Minneapolis
People from Winona County, Minnesota
RuPaul's Drag Race contestants